Danny Bass (born March 31, 1958) is a former linebacker for the Toronto Argonauts in 1980, Calgary Stampeders from 1981–1983 and the Edmonton Eskimos from 1984-1991 of the Canadian Football League. He won a Grey Cup for the Eskimos and played in another two for them. Bass was voted one of the CFL's top 50 players (#44) by Canadian sports network TSN.

Bass was the MVP of Michigan State University, his senior season of 1979. He is the all-time leader in career tackles for the Spartans.

Bass was inducted into the Canadian Football Hall of Fame in 2000.

References

1958 births
Living people
Calgary Stampeders players
Canadian Football Hall of Fame inductees
Canadian Football League Most Outstanding Defensive Player Award winners
Canadian football linebackers
Edmonton Elks players
Michigan State Spartans football players
Sportspeople from Lansing, Michigan
Players of American football from Michigan
Toronto Argonauts players
American players of Canadian football